Kempster may refer to:

 Kempster, Wisconsin, United States

People with the surname
 Albert Kempster (1875–?), British sport shooter
 André Gilbert Kempster (1916–1943), awarded the George Cross posthumously
 Christopher Kempster (1627–1715), English stonemason
 James Kempster (1892–1975), Irish cricketer
 Ken Kempster (born 1967), Canadian musician